Some interpretations of quantum mechanics posit a central role for an observer of a quantum phenomenon. The quantum mechanical observer is tied to the issue of observer effect, where a measurement necessarily requires interacting with the physical object being measured, affecting its properties through the interaction. The term "observable" has gained a technical meaning, denoting a Hermitian operator that represents a measurement.

The prominence of seemingly subjective or anthropocentric ideas like "observer" in the early development of the theory has been a continuing source of disquiet and philosophical dispute.  A number of new-age religious or philosophical views give the observer a more special role, or place constraints on who or what can be an observer. There is no credible peer-reviewed research that backs such claims. As an example of such claims, Fritjof Capra declared, "The crucial feature of atomic physics is that the human observer is not only necessary to observe the properties of an object, but is necessary even to define these properties."

The Copenhagen interpretation, which is the most widely accepted interpretation of quantum mechanics among physicists, posits that an "observer" or a "measurement" is merely a physical process. One of the founders of the Copenhagen interpretation, Werner Heisenberg, wrote:

Of course the introduction of the observer must not be misunderstood to imply that some kind of subjective features are to be brought into the description of nature. The observer has, rather, only the function of registering decisions, i.e., processes in space and time, and it does not matter whether the observer is an apparatus or a human being; but the registration, i.e., the transition from the "possible" to the "actual," is absolutely necessary here and cannot be omitted from the interpretation of quantum theory.

Niels Bohr, also a founder of the Copenhagen interpretation, wrote:

all unambiguous information concerning atomic objects is derived from the permanent marks such as a spot on a photographic plate, caused by the impact of an electron left on the bodies which define the experimental conditions. Far from involving any special intricacy, the irreversible amplification effects on which the recording of the presence of atomic objects rests rather remind us of the essential irreversibility inherent in the very concept of observation. The description of atomic phenomena has in these respects a perfectly objective character, in the sense that no explicit reference is made to any individual observer and that therefore, with proper regard to relativistic exigencies, no ambiguity is involved in the communication of information.

Likewise, Asher Peres stated that "observers" in quantum physics are

similar to the ubiquitous "observers" who send and receive light signals in special relativity. Obviously, this terminology does not imply the actual presence of human beings. These fictitious physicists may as well be inanimate automata that can perform all the required tasks, if suitably programmed.

Critics of the special role of the observer also point out that observers can themselves be observed, leading to paradoxes such as that of Wigner's friend; and that it is not clear how much consciousness is required. As John Bell inquired, "Was the wave function waiting to jump for thousands of millions of years until a single-celled living creature appeared? Or did it have to wait a little longer for some highly qualified measurer—with a PhD?"

See also 
 Observer (physics)
 Quantum foundations

References

Concepts in physics
Quantum mechanics